Bayreuth 1 is the eighth studio album by Joachim Witt, released 4 May 1998. It marks the beginning of the Bayreuth trilogy and the beginning of Witt's industrial side.

Track listing 

 Das jüngste Gericht "(Judgment Day)" – 4:05
 Das geht tief "(This Goes Deep)" – 5:28
 Träume, die kein Wind verweht "(Dreams that are not blown over)" – 4:22
 Die Flut (feat. Peter Heppner) "(The Flood)" – 5:41
 Wintermärz "(Winter March)" – 5:28
 Treibjagd "(Hunt)" – 4:29
 Trauma – 4:00
 Morgenstern "(Morningstar)" – 4:07
 Und... ich lauf "(And ... I run)" – 4:39
 Liebe und Zorn "(Love and Anger)" – 5:18
 Venusmond "(Venus Moon)" – 4:16
 Und... ich lauf (Laibach Remix) – 4:27 (Only Released on the Special Edition)

1998 albums
Joachim Witt albums